Louise Winslow Kidder Sparrow (January 1, 1884 – July 9, 1979) was an American sculptor and poet.

Early life and education
Born in Malden, Massachusetts, Sparrow was a graduate of Emerson College, and began her artistic instruction in Europe at age 16. Sparrow's father — Wellington Parker Kidder, the inventor of the noiseless typewriter — printed her first book of poetry, entitled Lyrics and Translations, in 1904. The volume won Sparrow admittance into The Boston Authors Club.

Career
Sparrow moved to Washington, D.C. around 1909 with her husband. There, she engaged in further studies in sculpture, working with Henry Kirke Bush-Brown, Edmund C. Messer, and Ulric Stonewall Jackson Dunbar. Primarily a sculptor of portrait busts, she exhibited in numerous local, national, and international exhibits. She was a member of the Society of Washington Artists and the American Artists's Professional League. Her work received a variety of honors during her career including a diploma of honor from the Paris Colonial Exposition in 1931 and a bronze medal from the 1930 exhibition of the Society of Washington Artists. Her plaster bust of Theodore E. Burton is currently in the collection of the United States Capitol; she is also represented in the collections of the Western Reserve Historical Society, the United States Military Academy, the United States Naval Observatory, the Montana State Capitol, and Howard University. Her involvement in a serious car crash in 1934 ended her sculpture career.

In the late 1920s or early-to-mid-1930s, Sparrow was hired as Editor of Translations for Star-Dust, A Journal of Poetry. She also wrote over a dozen volumes of verse, the last titled Midnight Meditation and completed shortly before her death.

Personal life
In 1909, Sparrow married Captain Herbert G. Sparrow of the United States Navy. In 1910, the couple's son, Herbert G. Sparrow,  was born. The younger Herbert later became a major general in the United States Army. Louise Sparrow died in 1979 at Walter Reed Army Medical Center after a myocardial infarction. She is buried with her husband at Arlington National Cemetery.

Legacy
Sparrow's papers are held at the Harvard University Libraries and National Museum of Women in the Arts. The latter institution holds a variety of Sparrow's sculpting tools.

Published works
Works of Poetry

Lyrics and Translations (privately printed, 1904)
The Last Cruise (Stratford Co., 1926)
My World Constitution (1938)
Narrative Poems: from Journal in Verse (Branden Press, 1970)
A Handful of Lyrics: from Journal in Verse (Thom Henricks Associates, 1970)
Violets and Mimosa: from Journal in Verse (Thom Henricks Associates, 1971)
Epic of the Sea: A Drama of Navy Life (1971)
Spiced Herbs and Rose Petals from the Old Blue Jar (Thom Henricks Associates, 1971)
Tales Retold at Twilight (1972)
Basket of Pansies (1974)
The Gentle Hours of Fresh Delights (Transcripts, 1976)
The Steed of Bengaray (J&C Transcripts, 1976)
Virginia Byways (n.d.)
Midnight Meditation (n.d.)

Translations

 Tankas by Nico D. Horiguchi (Erskine MacDonald, 1925)
 Air Temple by Daigaku Horiguchi (Abrams Press, 1972)
 The Might of Wings: Poets of Many Lands (n.d.)

References

External links
 Louise Kidder Sparrow Papers, 1900-1986 at National Museum of Women in the Arts
 Papers of Louise Kidder Sparrow, 1839-1964 at Harvard University Libraries
Behind the Scenes: A Few Reminiscences of a Washington Sculptor, an Archival Manuscript at the Library of Congress

1884 births
1979 deaths
American women sculptors
20th-century American sculptors
20th-century American male artists
20th-century American women artists
American portrait artists
People from Malden, Massachusetts
Sculptors from Massachusetts
Artists from Washington, D.C.
Burials at Arlington National Cemetery
Emerson College alumni